Chantae McMillan (born May 1, 1988) is an American heptathlete who competed at the 2012 Summer Olympics in London.

Prep career
Chantae McMillan attended Rolla High School in Rolla, Missouri, where she competed in the long jump and graduated in 2006. McMillan earned High School All-America accolades by finishing third in the long jump with a leap of 19 ft 4ins at the 2005 Nike Outdoor Nationals.

McMillan placed at the long jump at the Missouri State High School Activities Association outdoor Class 4 state track and field meet all four years. McMillan finished second to Leandra McGruder and earned a silver medal in the long jump as a senior in 2006 (18-9), winning titles as a junior in 2005 (19-5 1/2) and as a sophomore in 2004 (18-11) and earned a silver medal in the long jump as a freshman in 2003 (18-2 1/2).

McMillan won her only triple jump appearance at the state meet as a junior (38-7).

NCAA
McMillan then went to the University of Nebraska. In summer 2007, she became a competitor in combined events (pentathlon and heptathlon).  She compiled 4 Big XII Championships and set two school records, graduating as the most accomplished heptathlete in Nebraska Cornhuskers history.
McMillan placed fourth in Heptathlon at 2010 NCAA Division I Outdoor Track and Field Championships scoring 5583 points.  She placed second in the Pentathlon as a senior at the 2011 NCAA Division I Indoor Track and Field Championships behind Brianne Theisen-Eaton.

Professional
Chantae McMillan placed third scoring 6003 points at 2011 USA Outdoor Track and Field Championships behind Sharon Day 6058 points and Ryann Krais 6030 points.

McMillan qualified for the 2012 London Olympics at the U.S. Olympic trials on June 30, 2012. She placed third at the trials with a score of 6188 points. At the trials, McMillan set personal bests in 100 meter hurdles, 200 meters, shot put, javelin, and 800 meters and achieved the Olympic A standard.  At the 2012 Olympics, she finished in 28th place.

On June 20, 2015, McMillan scored 5601 points to place fifth overall in women's heptathlon at the Pan American Combined Events Cup.

McMillan is one of six athletes to be featured on the 2015 cover of ESPN's famous Body Issue.

In the 2015-2016 school year, McMillan trained and coached at University of Dayton in preparation for U.S. Olympic trials on July 10, 2016. McMillan placed fifth scoring a personal best 6326 points at the U.S. Olympic trials on July 10, 2016.

Television
Chantae McMillan competed on the NBC television series The Titan Games, and progressed through the competition to become a Titan by beating two-time Olympic gold medallist Claressa Shields. McMillian defended her Titan win against episode competitors once, before being dethroned by Dani Speegle.

References

External links 

  
 
 
 
 
 
 Chantae McMillan Athlete Business profile
 
 Chantae McMillan professional track and field results
 Chantae McMillan professional track and field All-Athletics profile

1988 births
Living people
American heptathletes
Athletes (track and field) at the 2012 Summer Olympics
Olympic track and field athletes of the United States
Nebraska Cornhuskers women's track and field athletes
African-American female track and field athletes
People from Clarksville, Tennessee
People from Rolla, Missouri
21st-century African-American sportspeople
21st-century African-American women
20th-century African-American people
20th-century African-American women